Christopher Michael DeStefano is a Grammy Award-winning American singer/songwriter, record producer, and multi-instrumentalist currently living in Nashville. As a songwriter, he has multiple #1 songs with artists Carrie Underwood (“Good Girl”, "Little Toy Guns"), Billy Currington (“Hey Girl”), Brett Eldredge ("Don't Ya"), Luke Bryan ("That's My Kind of Night", "Kick the Dust Up" ), Miranda Lambert & Carrie Underwood ("Somethin' Bad," later reworked as the opening theme for NBC Sunday Night Football), Rascal Flatts ("Rewind") and Jason Aldean ("Just Gettin' Started").

DeStefano was raised in Mount Laurel, New Jersey and graduated from Lenape High School in 1993. He was in the school's music program while playing with a progressive rock band in the area.

Underwood's "Good Girl", which DeStefano co-wrote, reached number 1 on Hot Country Songs in 2012. He also co-wrote and produced Brett Eldredge's number 1 single "Don't Ya". He co-wrote “Something in the Water” sung by Carrie Underwood which was the #1 song for seven weeks, the 3rd longest running female #1 Hot Country song in chart history. DeStefano co-wrote "Kiss Somebody" (July 2017) with Australian singer, Morgan Evans, and fellow American songwriter, Josh Osborne. At the APRA Music Awards of 2018 the song and its writers won Country Work of the Year.

Discography

Songwriting discography

Production discography

References

American country record producers
American country songwriters
American male songwriters
APRA Award winners
Lenape High School alumni
Living people
People from Mount Laurel, New Jersey
People from Nashville, Tennessee
Place of birth missing (living people)
Year of birth missing (living people)